Second Creek is a  long 3rd order tributary to the Uwharrie River in Randolph County, North Carolina.

Course
Second Creek rises on the Toms Creek divide about 1.5 miles northwest of Martha, North Carolina.  Second Creek then flows southeasterly to join the Uwharrie River about 3 miles east of Martha.

Watershed
Second Creek drains  of area, receives about 46.9 in/year of precipitation, has a wetness index of 395.86 and is about 49% forested.

See also
List of rivers of North Carolina

References

Rivers of North Carolina
Rivers of Randolph County, North Carolina